The 2008 League of Ireland First Division season was the 24th season of the League of Ireland First Division. The First Division was contested by 10 teams and Dundalk won the division.

Club information

Overview
The regular season began on 7 March and concluded on 15 November. Each team played the other teams four times, totaling 36 games. Only the champions, Dundalk, were automatically promoted and there was no promotion/relegation play-off between Premier Division and First Division teams. This was because the 2009 Premier Division would be reduced to 10 clubs.

Final table

Results

Matches 1 to 18

Rounds 19 and 36

Promotion/relegation play-offs
Kildare County and Mervue United, the highest ranked non-reserve team from the 2008 A Championship, played off to see who would play in the 2009 First Division. 

Mervue United won 5–2 on aggregate and were promoted to the First Division.

Top scorers

Gallery

See also
 2008 League of Ireland Premier Division
 2008 League of Ireland Cup
 2008 A Championship

References

 
League of Ireland First Division seasons
2008 League of Ireland
2008 in Republic of Ireland association football leagues
Ireland
Ireland